"Never Give Up" is a song by Ukrainian singer Maria Sur, released as a single on 25 February 2023. It was performed in Melodifestivalen 2023.

Charts

References

2023 songs
2023 singles
Melodifestivalen songs of 2023
Songs written by Laurell (singer)